L.A. Explosion! is the debut studio album by American power pop band The Last, released in 1979 by record label Bomp!.

Reception 

Trouser Press called it "a near-perfect debut, marred only by flat production."

Track listing

Personnel
The Last
Joe Nolte - guitar, lead vocals
Vitus Mataré - keyboard, flute
Mike Nolte - backing vocals, lead vocals on tracks 4, 8 and 15
David Nolte - bass, lead vocals on track 12
Jack Reynolds - drums

References

External links 
 

1979 albums
The Last (band) albums